Craigie may refer to:

Places

Australia
Craigie, New South Wales, see Snowy Monaro Regional Council#Towns and localities
Craigie, Victoria
Craigie, Western Australia, a suburb of Perth

Scotland, United Kingdom
Craigie, Dundee, a location
Barony of Craigie, a feudal barony in Dundee
Craigie (hamlet), Perth and Kinross, a village near Blairgowrie
Craigie, Perth, Scotland, an area directly southwest of Perth
Craigie, Ayr, a location in South Ayrshire
Craigie, South Ayrshire, a small village near Kilmarnock
Craigie Castle

People with the surname
 Billy Craigie, Aboriginal Australian activist, one of four co-founders of the Aboriginal Tent Embassy in 1972
Claude Craigie, Scottish footballer
Jill Craigie, British writer, filmmaker and actress
Patrick Craigie (1843–1930), British agricultural statistician
Pearl Mary Teresa Craigie (1867–1909), Anglo-American writer under pen-name John Oliver Hobbes
Robert Craigie, Lord Glendoick (1688–1760), Scottish politicians and judge, Member of Parliament for Tain Burghs 1742–1747
Admiral Robert William Craigie (1849–1911), Royal Navy admiral
Sir Robert Leslie Craigie, GCMG, CB, PC (1883–1959), British ambassador to Japan 1937–1941